Van der Beek, Van de Beek, Van der Beeck or Vanderbeek is a toponymic surname of Dutch origin meaning "from the brook". Notable people with the surname include:

Cor van der Beek (1948–1998), Dutch drummer for the band Shocking Blue
Harmsen van der Beek (1897–1953), Dutch illustrator and artist
James Van Der Beek (born 1977), American actor
Howard vander Beek (1917-2014), D-day Hero
Jeffrey Vanderbeek (born 1957), American businessman
Johannes Vanderbeek (born 1982), American contemporary artist 
Kelly VanderBeek (born 1983), Canadian alpine skier
Matt Vanderbeek (born 1967), American football player
Sara VanDerBeek (born 1976), American photography artist
Stan Vanderbeek (1927–1984), American film director
Van de Beek
Boy van de Beek (born 1993), Dutch footballer
Bram van de Beek (born 1946), Dutch theologian
Donny van de Beek (born 1997), Dutch footballer
Van der Beeck
Johannes van der Beeck alias Johannes Torrentius (1589–1644), Dutch painter

See also
Van Beek
Verbeek, a contraction of this surname

Dutch-language surnames
Surnames of Dutch origin